Andrzejczak is a Polish surname. Notable people with the surname include:

Bob Andrzejczak (born 1986), American politician
Leszek Andrzejczak (born 1959), Polish field hockey player
Rajmund Andrzejczak (born 1967), Polish general,  Chief of the General Staff of the Polish Armed Forces

Polish-language surnames